Astrid Jorgensen is an Australian vocalist, conductor and composer. She is the founder and director of Pub Choir.

Early life 
Jorgensen was born in Hamilton, New Zealand, and emigrated to Brisbane, Australia, in 1998. She attended Lourdes Hill College in Brisbane, graduating in 2006 as college captain. In school she had lessons in piano, violin, and voice.

She studied a Bachelor of Arts (Music) and a Graduate Diploma of Education at the University of Queensland, and a Master of Music Studies (Vocal Performance) at the Queensland Conservatorium of Music. While at the University of Queensland, Jorgensen trained in the Kodály method.

Career 
In 2011 Jorgensen formed the band Astrid & the Asteroids. The group was awarded the Billy Thorpe Scholarship at the 2012 Queensland Music Awards, and later disbanded in 2014.

After graduating from university she worked as a high school music and vocal teacher in Brisbane and Townsville and conducted multiple community choirs.

In 2017 Jorgensen founded Pub Choir in West End, Brisbane. At each Pub Choir event, Jorgensen arranges a popular song and teaches it to a non-trained audience in three-part harmony, concluding with a performance which is filmed and shared on social media. Pub Choir gained international attention in November 2017 when their rendition of Zombie by The Cranberries went viral online.

In 2018 Jorgensen was the resident choral arranger and conductor for Neil Finn’s Out of Silence show at HOTA. She arranged the songs Sisters and Ready or Not on the Spinifex Gum album Sisters with Felix Riebl and Ollie McGill from The Cat Empire. She was a featured guest in Tim Rogers' Liquid Nights in Bohemia Heights shows in 2019.

In March 2020, due to the COVID-19 pandemic and the subsequent cancellation of planned Pub Choir events, Jorgensen launched "Couch Choir". She arranged and uploaded three vocal harmonies of the song (They Long To Be) Close To You by The Carpenters to social media, inviting anybody to learn a part, film themselves singing it, and send it back for inclusion in a final video. There were over 1000 submissions from 18 different countries, and the project was featured on Australian Story. The final video was also shared by Richard Carpenter. Jorgensen continued to host free "Couch Choir" events throughout the pandemic, attracting tens of thousands of participants from over 50 countries.

Jorgensen has also worked as a producer for ABC Radio Brisbane, and has performed as a keyboardist in Australian indie rock band The Grates.

In 2021 Jorgensen was a consultant executive producer for the television special Australia's Biggest Singalong!, which was broadcast live on SBS from Sydney Town Hall. The two-hour special was co-created by Pub Choir in collaboration with Artemis Media and SBS and was hosted by Julia Zemiro and Miranda Tapsell. Throughout the interactive special, Jorgensen taught the live audience and home viewers a vocal arrangement of "Throw Your Arms Around Me" by Hunters & Collectors in real-time.

Recognition 
Jorgensen was awarded the 2019 Queensland Community Foundation Emerging Philanthropist of the Year as a result of her charitable work with Pub Choir. She was also a 2020 Queensland Young Australian of The Year nominee. In 2021 she was named one of the 40 Under 40 Most Influential Asian-Australians by the Asian-Australian Leadership Summit.

References 

Year of birth missing (living people)
Living people
New Zealand emigrants to Australia
People from Hamilton, New Zealand